Praepristus is a genus of ground beetles in the family Carabidae. There are about 13 described species in Praepristus, found in Indomalaya.

Species
These 13 species belong to the genus Praepristus:

 Praepristus borneensis Fedorenko, 2015  (Borneo, Indonesia, and Malaysia)
 Praepristus caviceps Fedorenko, 2015  (Vietnam)
 Praepristus depressus Fedorenko, 2015  (Vietnam)
 Praepristus foveiceps Fedorenko, 2015  (Vietnam)
 Praepristus grandis Fedorenko, 2015  (Vietnam)
 Praepristus kabakovi Fedorenko, 2015  (Vietnam)
 Praepristus nepalensis Kirschenhofer, 1999  (Nepal)
 Praepristus planus (Landin, 1955)  (Myanmar)
 Praepristus rugifoveatus (Louwerens, 1955)  (Borneo and Indonesia)
 Praepristus similis Fedorenko, 2015  (Vietnam)
 Praepristus sulcifer Fedorenko, 2015  (Vietnam)
 Praepristus testaceus Fedorenko, 2015  (Vietnam)
 Praepristus tonkinensis Fedorenko, 2015  (Vietnam)

References

Lebiinae